Reshmi Ghosh is an Indian beauty queen and actress.

Early life
Ghosh was born in 1978 and brought up in Kolkata. She attended school at Carmel Convent School (Class 10, 1995 batch). She graduated with a BA from Jogamaya Devi College in southern Kolkata in 2000. She has a younger sister.

Personal life
Ghosh married to Siddharth Vasudev, her co-star from Shobha Somnath Ki on 1 February 2013 at Kolkata. Ghosh and Vasudev played on-screen couple in Buddha.

Career
Since being crowned Miss India Earth 2002, Ghosh has appeared in several Bollywood films  as well as television serials  and advertisements. She did a Bollywood movie named "Tumse Milkar", based on a song from the film Pyar Jhukta Nahin, with Parvin Dabas.

Filmography

Television serials

References

External links 
 

21st-century Indian actresses
Femina Miss India winners
Jogamaya Devi College alumni
University of Calcutta alumni
Living people
Indian television actresses
Indian film actresses
Indian soap opera actresses
Actresses from Kolkata
Year of birth missing (living people)
Actresses in Hindi television
Miss Earth India delegates
Miss Earth 2002 contestants
Female models from Kolkata